Chötrul Düchen, also known as Chonga Choepa or the Butter Lamp Festival, is one of the four Buddhist festivals commemorating four events in the life of the Buddha, according to Tibetan traditions. Chötrul Düchen closely follows Losar, the Tibetan New Year. It takes place on the fifteenth day of the first month in the Tibetan calendar during the full moon (Bumgyur Dawa). The first fifteen days of the year celebrate the fifteen days during which the Buddha displayed miracles for his disciples so as to increase their devotion. During Chötrul Düchen ("Great Day of Miraculous Manifestations"), it is believed that the effects of both positive and negative actions are multiplied ten million times.

To commemorate the occasion, Tibetans make lamps, traditionally of yak butter, called butter lamps, in the shapes of flowers, trees, birds, and other auspicious symbols. They also create elaborate displays for the lamps in their homes and in public spaces, sometimes erecting structures as large as a building. All the lanterns are lit in celebration on the fifteenth day of the month.

References

Tibetan Buddhist festivals
Buddhist festivals in India
February observances
March observances
Observances set by the Tibetan calendar